A cone clutch serves the same purpose as a disk or plate clutch. However, instead of mating two spinning disks, the cone clutch uses two conical surfaces to transmit torque by friction.

The cone clutch transfers a higher torque than plate or disk clutches of the same size due to the wedging action and increased surface area. Cone clutches are generally now only used in low peripheral speed applications, although they were once common in automobiles and other internal combustion engine transmissions.

They are usually now confined to very specialist transmissions used in racing, rallying, or in extreme off-road vehicles, although they are common in power boats, dredge pumps and other ship-drive lines. This is because the clutch does not have to be pushed in all the way and the gears will be changed quicker. Small cone clutches are used in synchronizer mechanisms in manual transmissions and some limited-slip differentials.

Application Of Cone Clutch 

 Cone Clutch used in various manual transmissions as synchronisers.
 They are used in various heavy machines as they can transmit high torque.
 These clutches are generally used in low peripheral speed applications.
 Cone clutches are commonly used in power racing boats.
 Cone clutches are used in racing and rallying vehicles.
 Cone clutches are used in some automobiles and other combustion engine transmissions.

References

External links

Automobile Informer (2021) | By Krushna Sawant - What is a Cone Clutch mechanism?
Cone Clutch - Roymech - additional information about cone clutches (including diagrams)

Clutches
Automotive transmission technologies